In mathematics, the complex conjugate of a complex vector space  is a complex vector space , which has the same elements and additive group structure as  but whose scalar multiplication involves conjugation of the scalars. In other words, the scalar multiplication of  satisfies

More concretely, the complex conjugate vector space is the same underlying  vector space (same set of points, same vector addition and real scalar multiplication) with the conjugate linear complex structure  (different multiplication by ).

Motivation

With the use of the conjugate vector space , an antilinear map  can be regarded as an ordinary linear map of type  The linearity is checked by noting:

Conversely, any linear map defined on  gives rise to an antilinear map on 

This is the same underlying principle as in defining opposite ring so that a right -module can be regarded as a left -module, or that of an opposite category so that a contravariant functor  can be regarded as an ordinary functor of type

Complex conjugation functor
A linear map  gives rise to a corresponding  linear map  which has the same action as  Note that  preserves scalar multiplication because

Thus, complex conjugation  and  define a functor from the category of complex vector spaces to itself.

Structure of the conjugate
The vector spaces  and  have the same dimension over the complex numbers and are therefore isomorphic as complex vector spaces.

The double conjugate  is identical to

Complex conjugate of a Hilbert space 
Given a Hilbert space  (either finite or infinite dimensional), its complex conjugate  is the same vector space as its continuous dual space  
There is one-to-one antilinear correspondence between continuous linear functionals and vectors. 

In quantum mechanics, the conjugate to a ket vector  is denoted as  – a bra vector (see bra–ket notation).

See also

 
 
 
 conjugate bundle

References

Further reading
 Budinich, P. and Trautman, A. The Spinorial Chessboard. Springer-Verlag, 1988. . (complex conjugate vector spaces are discussed in section 3.3, pag. 26).

Linear algebra
Vector space